Fara Olivana con Sola is a comune (municipality) in the Province of Bergamo in the Italian region of Lombardy, located about  east of Milan and about  southeast of Bergamo.

Fara Olivana con Sola borders the following municipalities: Bariano, Castel Gabbiano, Covo, Fornovo San Giovanni, Isso, Mozzanica, Romano di Lombardia. It is formed by two main settlements: Fara Olivana on the north, set of the pieve of Santo Stefano, and the frazione Sola southwards.

References